Die Hermannsschlacht (translated as The Battle of Hermann and Hermann's Battle) is a drama in five acts written in 1808 by Heinrich von Kleist. It is based on the Battle of the Teutoburg Forest which took place between the Romans and Germanic tribes in the Teutoburg Forest, now in Nordrhein-Westfalen in western Germany.

History
The play was written after the Prussian defeat by Napoleon I, and it has been speculated that Kleist meant it as a call for resistance to the French. Recent scholarship contradicts and refutes such speculation.

The French victory at Wagram, delayed the performance.
It was not published until 1821 and received its first performance only in 1860.

Plot
Hermann, Prince of Cherusci is beset from two sides. The Suebi, Maroboduus stands in the southeast of his country and calls a toll on him. The Roman general Varus threatened him with three legions from the West and offers his help against Marbod, but he has secretly offered to act with him against Hermann. The Germanic princes gather with Hermann, and force him to make war against the Romans, which he refuses, because of the military inferiority of the Germans.

Hermann's wife Thusnelda is courted by the Roman legate Ventidius, who secretly cuts off a lock of her blond hair.
Ventidius brings about an ultimate offer of help to the Romans, Hermann accepts the offer eventually. At the same time, however, this is in conjunction with Marbod, whom he informed about the duplicity of Varus together against him and offers him to join the battle. The Romans marched into the land of one Cherusci village and destroy it. Hermann uses the behavior of the Romans to stir up hatred among the people against them. He encounters Varus in Teutoburg, who can be fooled by him.

Marbod is reluctant to ally with the Cherusci, but is convinced firstly by the escape of his Roman advisors, and secondly because, as proof of his loyalty, Hermann put the lives of Marbod's two sons into the hands of Suevenfürsten. The rape of a girl gives Germanic Hermann an occasion to call the people to revolt against the Romans. He shows Thusnelda a letter from Ventidius, in which he promises the Empress Livia a lock of Thusnelda's blond hair. The Romans wander through the Teutoburg Forest and are abandoned by their Germanic allies. Thusnelda gets revenge on Ventidius by luring him into the enclosure of a bear that then kills him. In the battle of the Teutoburg Forest, the Roman legions of Varus are defeated and their commander killed.

Reception
The play Hermannsschlacht premiered  finally in 1860, in an edited version of Feodor Wehl in Breslau (modern day Wroclaw), but without much success.
Other performances of this version of the text in Dresden, Leipzig, Hamburg, Stuttgart and Graz in 1861, and festival performances the fiftieth anniversary of the Battle of Leipzig in 1863 in Karlsruhe and Kassel were also unsuccessful. Another version by Rudolf Genée arose in 1871, after the war against France and was first performed in Munich.

Only with the productions of the Berlin Schauspielhaus and the Meiningen Court Theatre in 1875, did the piece gain popularity with the audience. The Meininger staging was by recourse to the original Kleist, playing a convincing ensemble, and the crowd scenes stylistically impressive. Altogether there were 103 performances in 16 German-speaking stages, with the last toured in 1890 to St. Petersburg, Moscow and Odessa. Meiningen staged 36 performances.

Last with the Berlin performance in 1912, for the centennial anniversary of the liberation wars, attended the premiere of the imperial family, which was Hermann battle as a patriotic drama. In the First World War, shows were interrupted by the latest news from the Western Front. For the period of National Socialism, the Hermann battle reached a political climax, just for the 1933/34 season are 146 performances demonstrated/performed. Therefore, the piece after 1945 was only rarely performed, only the Harz mountain valley theater in the GDR, there were 1957 with a production of political bias against the United States and its Western allies.

In his internationally successful production of 1982,  at the Schauspielhaus Bochum cut out the subplot between Thusnelda and Hermann (Gert Voss). Peymann saw in the piece the "model of a liberation war" with all its contradictions.

Bibliography
Die Hermannsschlacht, Kleist Archive Sembdner

References

External links
"Kleist's Treatment of Imperialism: "Die Hermannsschlacht" and "Die Verlobung in St. Domingo"", R. K. Angress, Monatshefte, Vol. 69, No. 1 (Spring, 1977), pp. 17–33

1808 plays
Plays by Heinrich von Kleist
Battle of the Teutoburg Forest